Lynch Creek is a  long 2nd order tributary to Hyco Creek in Caswell County, North Carolina.

Course
Lynch Creek rises about 1.5 miles northwest of Carr, North Carolina in Orange County, and then flows northerly to join Hyco Creek about 1 mile southeast of Hightowers.

Watershed
Lynch Creek drains  of area, receives about 46.6 in/year of precipitation, has a topographic wetness index of 363.27, and is about 54% forested.

References

Rivers of North Carolina
Rivers of Caswell County, North Carolina
Rivers of Orange County, North Carolina
Tributaries of the Roanoke River